For Better or Worse is a 1995 American comedy-drama film written by Jeff Nathanson and directed by Jason Alexander, who stars alongside Lolita Davidovich and James Woods. The film was given a limited theatrical release, and aired on TNT in 1996.

Plot
Michael Makeshift is a lonely, sad man who can't get over the fact his fiancée dumped him. He regularly attends various support groups to meet people. To make matters worse, his landlord is beginning to bug him for long-overdue rent.

It seems that things for Michael's brother Reggie are much better. A con, he regularly dupes his family, all of whom are oblivious except for Michael. He appears on his doorstep, newly married to Valerie. Reggie asks him to look after her, who's puzzled when she awakes at Michael's apartment after Reggie left her there whilst she was drunk and unconscious.

Valerie also does not know that Reggie has paid Michael for the favor, while he 'takes care of some business'. Disoriented when she wakes up, Valerie slowly warms to Michael.

Despite his well-laid plans to rob the credit union where his own mother works, things go badly for Reggie. His henchmen mutiny and force him to reveal that the clueless Valerie carries the security codes they need to pull off the job in her suitcase.

A chase ensues. While Michael helps Valerie escape, he reveals the truth about Reggie. At the same time, she becomes increasingly attracted to her new protector. Staying overnight in his dad's now closed hardware store, Reggie's henchmen find her, forcing her and Reggie to hit the credit union.

In the end, the henchmen are arrested, Reggie and Michael are released, and the later and Valerie (who hadn't married Reggie after all) declare their mutual love and kiss.

Cast
 Jason Alexander as Michael Makeshift
 Lolita Davidovich as Valeri Carboni
 James Woods as Reggie Makeshift
 Joe Mantegna as Stone
 Jay Mohr as Dwayne
 Robert Costanzo as Ranzier
 Bea Arthur as Beverly Makeshift (Uncredited) Arthur refused to receive a screen credit for this film.
 Eda Reiss Merin as Rose
 John Amos as Gray
 Rob Reiner as Dr. Plosner
 Haley Joel Osment as Danny
 Tiffany Salerno as Cindy
 Beau Gravitte as Bob
 Una Damon as the Bartender
 Jerry Adler as Morton Makeshift
 Rip Torn as Captain Cole
 Steven Wright as Cabbie

Release

Box office
The film was first shown in America on March 19, 1995, and in the UK on 29 December 1995. On 1 April 1997, the film premiered in Italy and in Hungary too on 20 May 1997. In Sweden, the film first received a TV premier on 1 August 2004. The film grossed $25,912 on its opening weekend in America across 24 screens before totaling $40,622 by the end of March.

Critical reception
Iotis Erlewine of Allmovie gave the film two out of five stars. Both Video Movie Guide 2002 and Video Source Book gave the film two out of five stars as well.

In 2004, Vince Leo of Qwipster.net gave an unfavorable review, stating: "Not exactly the directorial debut that 'Seinfeld' favorite Jason Alexander would have hoped for, 'For Better or Worse' is little more than a ninety-minute collection of strained situations and unfunny moments. The problems start early, as it is just a bad idea for a romantic comedy to begin with, and it certainly doesn't help that Jeff Nathanson can't inject anything fresh into it. 'For Better or Worse' isn't devoid of comedy, as it did occasionally make me chuckle, but not nearly enough as it made me annoyed. 'For Better or Worse' is a rhetorical proposition, as all Alexander delivers is worse and worse.  Unless you find him completely irresistible, there's not much going for this inept misfire."

The Atlanta Journal-Constitution reviewed the film upon release, giving a rating of two and a half stars out of four, noting: "Exceedingly strange comedy wavers between hilarity and "huh?". 'For Better or Worse' just strange enough for cable."

Home media
Following its release, For Better or Worse remained out-of-print and only available on VHS, although, in recent years, it is available as a download via iTunes and on Amazon via Instant Video. In 1996, Home Video Hellas released the film on VHS in Greece, whilst LK-TEL Vídeo released it on the same format in Brazil. In 1999, Turner Home Entertainment released the film in America on VHS. Sony Pictures Home Entertainment released the film in the UK in 1999, where it featured slightly different artwork to the American release.

References

External links

1995 films
Films directed by Jason Alexander
1995 comedy-drama films
Columbia Pictures films
Films with screenplays by Jeff Nathanson
1995 directorial debut films
American comedy-drama films
Films scored by Miles Goodman
1990s English-language films
1990s American films